Marinella is a Philippine television series by ABS-CBN. It premiered on February 8, 1999, replacing Cristy Per Minute when it moved to its new timeslot. The series ended on May 11, 2001, and it was replaced by Recuerdo de Amor.

Starring Camille Prats, Shaina Magdayao and Serena Dalrymple and was aired every afternoon (1:30 pm from February 8, 1999, until March 9, 2001; later at 2pm from March 12, 2001, until May 11, 2001) after Magandang Tanghali... Bayan!.

The series is currently streaming online on Jeepney TV YouTube channel every 2:00 pm & 2:30 pm replacing Recuerdo de Amor.

Premise
The lives of three friends, Marie de Guzmán, Rina Fuentes, and Ella Domingo are intertwined. After a huge fire separated the girls from their respective families, they decided to band together as a unit they can call a family.

They have overlooked one big obstacle: Katrina Rodriguez will never allow the three to live in peace. Katrina is out to destroy each of them because Marie is the daughter of Katrina's former lover; Rina knows too much of Rodríguez family's secrets; and Ella is the sole heir of the ₱800-million wealth of the Rodríguez family. Katrina's nemesis is Doña Corazón, who is ready to stop her; as her long-lost aunt, she knows Katrina's darkest secrets.

Cast and characters

Protagonists
 Camille Prats as Marie de Guzmán
 Shaina Magdayao as Rina Fuentes / Angelica Villareal
 Serena Dalrymple as Ella Domingo / Ella Rodríguez

Special participation
 Río Locsin as Katrina Rodríguez-Villareal
 Hilda Koronel as Adela Rodríguez
 Eula Valdez as Lilybeth "Bebeng" Marasigan

Main cast
 Lito Pimentel as Federico Villareal
 Rita Ávila as Marisa Rodríguez / Michelle dela Cruz
 Raymond Bagatsing as Leo Rodríguez and Jake Arcellana-Rodríguez
 Carmen Enríquez as Doña Corazón Rodríguez
 Bella Flores as Doña Guada Villareal
 Allan Paule as Abel de Guzmán
 Alicia Alonzo as Minda
 Emilio Garcia as Julio de Guzmán
 Bojo Molina as Ron
 Agatha Tapan as Vanessa R. Villareal
 Perla Bautista as Mameng Marasigan
 Richard Bonin as Rolly

Extended cast
 Sharmaine Suárez as Sheila Fuentes
 William Lorenzo as Rodolfo "Dolfo" Fuentes
 Rica Peralejo as Jenny
 Andrea del Rosario as Bianca 
 Joy Viado as Doray
 Connie Chua as Loida 
 Anita Linda as Doña Beatriz
 Pewee O' Hara as Atty. Galang
 Dexter Doria as Belinda
 Princess Schuck as Cristina
 Piolo Pascual as Paolo 
 Gerard Pizzaras as Emil
 Gigi Locsin as Cora
 Stefano Mori as Jun
 Tess Dumpit as Lucy
 John Lapus as Uncle Joselito 
 Star Villareal as Joey
 Maricel Laxa as Jessica
 Melissa de León as Raquel
 Andrei Félix as RJ
 Timmy Cruz as Doctor Anna Rivera / Susana Villareal
 Esther Chavez as Doña Salve Arcellana
 Mel Martínez as Artemio "Tembong" Panganiban
 Mel Kimura as Shirley
 Froilan Sales as George
 Gandong Cervantes as Rodel
 Juan Carlos Castillo as Baldo
 Gilleth Sandico as Mrs. Tan
 JR Herrera as Ned
 Lester Llansang as Joseph
 Sandra Gómez as Lory
 Eva Darren as Editha
 Pocholo Montes as Atty. Arturo Trinidad
 Allan Bautista as Johnny
 Ama Quiambao as Carmen
 Vangie Labalan as Inday
 Dodie Acuna as Danilo
 Susan Corpuz as Mila
 BJ de Jesus as Buboy
 Vivian Foz as Irma de Guzmán/Trina
 Jodi Sta. Maria as Young Guada
 Dimples Romana as Young Corazon

Reruns
Marinella was previously aired internationally via Cinema One Global from 2013 to 2014. In 2022, reruns of the series began to air on Kapamilya Online Live Global every 12:00 am to 2:00 am from February 17 to August 3, 2022; it was succeeded by Nang Ngumiti ang Langit the following day (August 4).

See also
List of programs broadcast by ABS-CBN
List of ABS-CBN drama series

References

ABS-CBN drama series
1999 Philippine television series debuts
2001 Philippine television series endings
Filipino-language television shows
Television shows set in the Philippines
1990s Philippine television series